Kévin Boma (born 20 November 2002) is a professional footballer who plays as a defender for  club Rodez. Born in France, he has represented Togo at youth international level

Club career

Early years
Boma was born in Poitiers, Nouvelle-Aquitaine, and progressed through the youth teams of local Trois Cités Poitiers and Stade Poitevin before joining the Guingamp academy at age 14.

He signed with the reserve team of Tours after a successful trial in January 2019. He made his senior debut for the team on 18 May 2019 in a Championnat National 3 match against Montargis.

Angers
Boma signed with Angers in 2019, initially becoming a part of the reserves. 

On 7 March 2021, Boma made his professional debut for Angers in the Coupe de France, coming on as a substitute in the 78th minute for Ibrahim Amadou as his team knocked out Club Franciscain with a 5–0 win.

Rodez
On 9 August 2022, Boma signed a three-year contract with Rodez.

International career
On 24 March 2022, Boma made his international debut for Togo U23. It resulted in a 1–0 win over the Tajikistan U23.

References

External links 
 
 
 

2002 births
Living people
Sportspeople from Poitiers
Togolese footballers
Togo youth international footballers
French footballers
French sportspeople of Togolese descent
Association football defenders
Stade Poitevin FC players
En Avant Guingamp players
Tours FC players
Angers SCO players
Rodez AF players
Championnat National 2 players
Championnat National 3 players
Black French sportspeople
Footballers from Nouvelle-Aquitaine